The 9th Annual Grammy Awards were held on March 2, 1967, at Chicago, Los Angeles, Nashville and New York. They recognized accomplishments of musicians for the year 1966. The 9th Grammy Awards is notable for not presenting the Grammy Award for Best New Artist. Frank Sinatra won 5 awards.

Award winners
Record of the Year
Jimmy Bowen (producer) & Frank Sinatra for "Strangers in the Night"
Album of the Year
Sonny Burke (producer) & Frank Sinatra for A Man and His Music
Song of the Year
John Lennon & Paul McCartney (songwriters) for "Michelle" performed by The Beatles

Children's
Best Recording for Children
Marvin Miller for Dr. Seuss Presents - "If I Ran the Zoo" and "Sleep Book"

Classical
Best Classical Performance - Orchestra
Erich Leinsdorf (conductor) & the Boston Symphony Orchestra for Mahler: Symphony No. 6 in A Minor
Best Classical Vocal Soloist Performance (with or without orchestra)
Francesco Molinari-Pradelli (conductor), Leontyne Price & the RCA Italiana Opera Orchestra for Prima Donna (Works of Barber, Purcell, etc.)
Best Opera Recording
Georg Solti (conductor), Régine Crespin, Hans Hotter, James King, Christa Ludwig, Birgit Nilsson, & the Vienna Philharmonic Orchestra for Wagner: Die Walkure
Best Classical Choral Performance (other than opera)
Robert Shaw (conductor) & the Robert Shaw Orchestra & Chorale for Handel: Messiah
George Bragg (conductor), Gregg Smith (choir director), the Gregg Smith Singers, the Ithaca College Concert Choir, the Texas Boys Choir & the Columbia Chamber Orchestra for Ives: Music for Chorus
Best Classical Performance - Instrumental Soloist or Soloists (with or without orchestra)
Julian Bream for Baroque Guitar (Works of Bach, Sanz, Weiss, etc.)
Best Chamber Music Performance - Instrumental or Vocal
Boston Symphony Chamber Players for Boston Symphony Chamber Players - Works of Mozart, Brahms, Beethoven, Fine, Copland, Carter, Piston
Album of the Year - Classical
Howard Scott (producer), Morton Gould (conductor) & the Chicago Symphony Orchestra for Ives: Symphony No. 1 in D Minor

Comedy
Best Comedy Performance
Bill Cosby for Wonderfulness

Composing and arranging
Best Instrumental Theme
Neal Hefti (composer) for "Batman Theme"
Best Original Score Written for a Motion Picture or Television Show
Maurice Jarre (composer) for  Dr. Zhivago
Best Instrumental Arrangement
Herb Alpert (arranger) for "What Now My Love" performed by Herb Alpert & the Tijuana Brass
Best Arrangement Accompanying a Vocalist or Instrumentalist
Ernie Freeman (arranger) for "Strangers in the Night" performed by Frank Sinatra

Country
Best Country & Western Vocal Performance - Female
Jeannie Seely for "Don't Touch Me"
Best Country and Western Vocal Performance, Male
David Houston for "Almost Persuaded"
Best Country & Western Recording
David Houston for "Almost Persuaded"
Best Country & Western Song
Billy Sherrill & Glenn Sutton (songwriters) for "Almost Persuaded" performed by David Houston

Folk
Best Folk Recording
Cortelia Clark for Blues in the Street

Gospel
Best Sacred Recording (Musical)
Porter Wagoner & the Blackwood Brothers for Grand Old Gospel

Jazz
Best Instrumental Jazz Performance - Group or Soloist with Group
Wes Montgomery for "Goin' Out of My Head"
Best Original Jazz Composition
Duke Ellington for "In the Beginning God"

Musical show
Best Score From an Original Cast Show Album
Jerry Herman (composer) & the original cast (Angela Lansbury, Bea Arthur, Jane Connell, Charles Braswell, Jerry Lanning & Frankie Michaels ) for Mame

Packaging and notes
Best Album Cover, Graphic Arts
Klaus Voormann (graphic artist) for Revolver performed by The Beatles
Best Album Cover, Photography
Robert M. Jones (art director) & Les Leverette (photographer) for Confessions of a Broken Man performed by Porter Wagoner
Best Album Notes
Stan Cornyn (notes writer) for Sinatra at the Sands performed by Frank Sinatra

Pop
Best Vocal Performance, Female
Eydie Gorme for "If He Walked Into My Life"
Best Vocal Performance, Male
Frank Sinatra for "Strangers in the Night"
Best Performance by a Vocal Group
Anita Kerr for "A Man and a Woman" performed by the Anita Kerr Singers
Best Performance by a Chorus
Ray Conniff (choir director) for "Somewhere My Love (Lara's Theme From Dr. Zhivago)" performed by the Ray Conniff Singers
Best Instrumental Performance (Other Than Jazz)
Herb Alpert for "What Now My Love" performed by Herb Alpert & the Tijuana Brass
Best Contemporary (R&R) Solo Vocal Performance - Male or Female
Paul McCartney for "Eleanor Rigby"
Best Contemporary (R&R) Group Performance, Vocal or Instrumental
The Mamas & the Papas for "Monday, Monday"
Best Contemporary (R&R) Recording
New Vaudeville Band for "Winchester Cathedral"

Production and engineering
Best Engineered Recording - Non-Classical
Eddie Brackett & Lee Herschberg (engineers) for "Strangers in the Night" performed by Frank Sinatra
Best Engineered Recording - Classical
Anthony Salvatore (engineer), Erich Leinsdorf (conductor), the Pro Musica Chorus & the Boston Symphony Orchestra for Wagner: Lohengrin

R&B
Best R&B Solo Vocal Performance, Male or Female
Ray Charles for "Crying Time"
Best Rhythm & Blues Group Performance, Vocal or Instrumental
Ramsey Lewis for "Hold It Right There"
Best Rhythm & Blues Recording
Ray Charles for "Crying Time"

Spoken
Best Spoken Word, Documentary or Drama Recording
Edward R. Murrow for Edward R. Murrow - A Reporter Remembers, Vol. I The War Years

References

 009
1967 in California
1967 in Illinois
1967 in Tennessee
1967 music awards
20th century in Chicago
20th century in Nashville, Tennessee
1967 in New York City
1967 in American music
1967 in Los Angeles
March 1967 events in the United States